Bartholda van Swieten (2 April 1566, The Hague – 15 October 1647, The Hague) was a Dutch noble and diplomat who acted as official mediary between the Netherlands and the Spanish Netherlands from 1615 until 1629. She is the subject of fiction, a play and the Dutch novel Een haagsche joffer (1856). Her career as a diplomat was highly unusual for her gender in 17th-century Europe.

Life
Van Swieten was the daughter of Adriaan van Swieten (1532–1584), governor of Gouda, and Josina van Naaldwijk (1540–1575). She married Floris T'Serclaes (1540–1612), bailiff of Schoonhoven, in 1588. She was a Catholic and belonged to a family who left the south after having sided with the Protestants, but after the peace of 1609 she travelled back and forth between the free and the Spanish Netherlands, as she had property in the Spanish Netherlands, where her daughters also lived.

Van Swieten's frequent travels and good connections made her a popular messenger between the two territories, and in 1615, she was given the title General Director by the Netherlands when she was asked to handle an assignment regarding a valuable carpet. In 1621, she handled the negotiations between the ruler of the Netherlands, Maurice, Prince of Orange, and the regent of the Spanish Netherlands, Albert VII, Archduke of Austria in Brussels, regarding the authority over some of the provinces. After this, she was regularly used as a diplomat and a messenger between the two courts; she was given the formal authority to issue negotiations about matters of state, and her expenses were covered by the state. In 1624, she was responsible for a negotiation regarding a prisoner exchange. Her last paid assignment was performed in 1629. She died in The Hague.

France was impressed by van Swieten's ability, and Archduke Albert worked well with her, but Venice ridiculed her, and her assignments there were rarely successful, as the tension between the two territories was too great at this point.

See also
 Catharina Stopia, another contemporary female diplomat

References 
 Digitaal Vrouwenlexicon van Nederland
 Charles Poplimont, La Belgique héraldique, deel 11 (Parijs 1867) 31-33.
 H.J. Schimmel, Een haagsche joffer. Historische schets uit de zeventiende eeuw (Amsterdam 1856).
 De Navorscher 19 (1869) 434-438.
 R.C. Bakhuizen van den Brink, ‘Twee historische romans’, in: Idem, Studiën en schetsen over vaderlandsche geschiedenis en letteren, deel 3 (Den Haag 1876) 385-400.
 A. Waddington, La République des Provinces-Unies: & les Pays-Bas Espagnols de 1630 à 1650, deel 1 (Parijs 1895) 58-60.
 Relazioni Veneziane. Venetiaansche berichten over de Vereenigde Nederlanden van 1600-1795, P.J. Blok ed. (Den Haag 1909) 236.
 P. Geyl, Christofforo Suriano, resident van de Serenissime Republiek van Venetië in Den Haag, 1616-1623 (Den Haag 1913) 312-315.
 J. Cuvelier, ‘La correspondance secrète de l'Infante Isabelle (1621-1633)’, Bulletin de l'Institut Historique Belge de Rome (1926) 103-119, aldaar 108-109.
L. Cnockaert, Giovanni-Francesco Guidi di Bagno, nuntius te Brussel (1621-1627) (Brussel 1956) 94.
 J.J. Poelhekke, T’uytgaen van den Trêves: Spanje en de Nederlanden in 1621 (Groningen 1960) 73-80, 150-154.
 A.J. Veenendaal sr., Johan van Oldenbarnevelt. Bescheiden betreffende zijn staatkundig beleid en zijn familie, deel 3: 1614-1620 (Den Haag 1967).
 A. Alberts, De Hollanders komen ons vermoorden. De scheiding tussen Noord- en Zuid-Nederland, 1585-1648 (Amsterdam 1975) 47-49.
 Jonathan I. Israel, The Dutch Republic and the Hispanic world, 1606-1661 (Oxford 1982) 75-77, 83, 154-157.
 Resoluties Staten-Generaal 1626-1630. URL: www.inghist.nl/Onderzoek/Projecten/BesluitenStaten-generaal1626-1651 [laatst geraadpleegd November 2009].

1566 births
1647 deaths
17th-century Dutch women
Nobility from The Hague
Dutch women diplomats
Diplomats from The Hague
17th-century civil servants
17th-century diplomats
Nobility of the Spanish Netherlands